Cecil William Kaye (25 June 1865 – 15 May 1941) was a British educationalist.  He was headmaster of three schools; Loughborough Grammar School, 1893–1900; Bedford Modern School, 1901–1916 (and Principal of Bedford Evening Institution 1901–1916); and St Bees School, 1916–1926.

Kaye was educated at Marlborough College; University College, Oxford and the University of Würzburg.

Kaye married Dora Millicent, daughter of late Judge William Barber, QC.

References

1865 births
1941 deaths
Alumni of University College, Oxford
Heads of schools in England
People educated at Marlborough College